Middleton or Middleton-by-Wirksworth is an upland village and civil parish lying approximately one mile NNW of Wirksworth, Derbyshire, England. Middleton was, in 1086, a berewick (a supporting farm) of the town and manor of Wirksworth. Middleton was formerly known for its lead mines and high quality limestone quarries, including the underground quarry site at Middleton Mine. Part of the tunnel collapsed in the 1980s leaving a noticeable depression in the ground above on the eastern side of Middleton Moor. The population of the parish as taken at the 2011 Census was 775.

The attraction towards Middleton becoming a village had much to do with the fact that it is one of the few Derbyshire villages in the limestone area that has a ‘perched’ water table due to the impervious volcanic rock and shale formations within its topology.  The availability of water was the incentive behind it becoming a choice of settlement. Middleton formed originally in the Saxon times as a small farming hamlet which settled around a very high spring.

The former Cromford and High Peak Railway passes close by the village. The local quarries were linked to this line by a short branch spur, Killer's Branch, part of which now forms the track bed of the Steeple Grange Light Railway. The branch line was operational until the late 1960s.

In the 1970s, the disused track bed of the Cromford and High Peak Railway and some surrounding land were purchased by the Derbyshire County Council and the Peak Park Planning Board, who then worked collaboratively to turn the former railway into the  High Peak Trail for walkers and cyclists. Middleton Top lies near the southern end of the trail, which starts at High Peak Junction.  There is a car park and visitor centre at Middleton Top, where cycles may be hired.

The engine, built by the Butterley Company of Ripley in 1829, still runs for demonstration purposes and is occasionally open to the public.

The northern part of the village on the west side of the main road out towards New Road is called 'The Hall' due to the location of the now demolished Middleton Hall.

The cold winter of 1947 combined with the exposed nature of Middleton meant that snow was present even during the summer following the heavy snowfall.

Middleton is dependent on the market town of Wirksworth for many of its services, such as its health centre, leisure centre, high school (the Anthony Gell School) and nearby shops, petrol and so on. The closest railway station to Middleton is Wirksworth on the Ecclesbourne Valley Railway.

Literary connection
In 1918-19, D. H. Lawrence and his wife Frieda rented Mountain Cottage, which stands below the B5023 road on the NW side of village as the road descends towards the Via Gellia. Lawrence also reputedly spent time at Woodland Cottage (formerly known as The Woodlands) on the opposite side of New Road. While living in Middleton during the bitter winter of 1918-19, Lawrence wrote the short story A Wintry Peacock (published in 1921), which is set in the immediate locality.

See also
Listed buildings in Middleton-by-Wirksworth

References

General references
D. H. Lawrence: Triumph to Exile, 1912-1922 by Mark Kinkead-Weekes (1996, CUP, Cambridge, England).

Inline citations

External links
Notes on the Cromford and High Peak Railway
Middleton Top Countryside Centre (Derbyshire County Council)
 Downloadable .pdf and .txt files of the entire text of A Wintry Peacock
British Geological Survey page on Middleton Mine
 British Geological Survey page on 'White Walls' with aerial photo showing the many stone-walled field enclosures surrounding the village.
Village website with details of annual festival, archive photos and historical background.
Aerial photo of village looking E towards Dene Quarry, Cromford.
A genealogy of the Brooks family of Middleton by Wirksworth 

Villages in Derbyshire
Towns and villages of the Peak District
Civil parishes in Derbyshire
Derbyshire Dales